Aaron Adeoye (born August 26, 1993) is an American football defensive end for the Arlington Renegades of the XFL. He played college football at Southeast Missouri State University.

College career
Adeoye played college basketball for Ball State, John A. Logan College, Western Kentucky, and Southeast Missouri State. He switched to football in his fifth season of college eligibility for the Southeast Missouri State Redhawks football team.

Professional career

Indoor and minor leagues
Adeoye signed with the Salina Liberty of Champions Indoor Football in April 2017. He played in The Spring League in 2018, and played for the Birmingham Iron of the Alliance of American Football before the league folded in April 2019.

Baltimore Ravens
Adeoye had a minicamp tryout with the Baltimore Ravens and subsequently signed with the team on May 6, 2019. He was waived during final roster cuts on August 31, 2019, and signed to the team's practice squad the next day.

Adeoye signed a reserve/future contract with the Baltimore Ravens on January 13, 2020. He was waived during final roster cuts on September 5, 2020, and re-signed to the practice squad the next day. He was elevated to the active roster on December 2 for the team's week 12 game against the Pittsburgh Steelers, and reverted to the practice squad after the game. On January 18, 2021, Adeoye signed a reserve/futures contract with the Ravens. He was waived on August 16, 2021.

New York Jets
On August 23, 2021, Adeoye signed a one-year deal with the New York Jets. He was waived on August 31, 2021.

Green Bay Packers
On October 19, 2021, Adeoye was signed to the Green Bay Packers practice squad. He was released on November 2, 2021. He was signed to the practice squad again on December 29. He was released on January 1, 2022.

Birmingham Stallions
Adeoye was selected with the third pick of the second round of the 2022 USFL Draft by the Birmingham Stallions. He was placed on injured reserve on May 12, 2022, with a chest injury.

Arlington Renegades
The Arlington Renegades selected Adeoye in the fifth round of the 2023 XFL Supplemental Draft on January 1, 2023.

References

External links
Southeast Missouri State Redhawks men's basketball bio
Western Kentucky Hilltoppers basketball bio
Ball State Cardinals men's basketball bio

1993 births
Living people
People from Marion, Illinois
Basketball players from Illinois
Players of American football from Illinois
Forwards (basketball)
American football defensive ends
Ball State Cardinals men's basketball players
John A. Logan Volunteers men's basketball players
Western Kentucky Hilltoppers basketball players
Southeast Missouri State Redhawks men's basketball players
Southeast Missouri State Redhawks football players
Salina Liberty players
The Spring League players
Birmingham Iron players
Baltimore Ravens players
New York Jets players
Green Bay Packers players
Birmingham Stallions (2022) players
Arlington Renegades players